Ascochyta fabae f.sp. lentis is a plant pathogen that causes ascochyta blight on lentil.

See also
List of Ascochyta species

References

External links
 USDA ARS Fungal Database

Fungal plant pathogens and diseases
Eudicot diseases
fabae f.sp. lentis
Forma specialis taxa
Fungi described in 1986
Lentil